Post Tribune is a name that refers to various newspapers:

 Post-Tribune (Indiana newspaper)
 Dallas Post Tribune
 Post and Tribune, title of a predecessor of the Detroit Tribune